First League of Central Bosnia Canton is a fourth level league in the Bosnia and Herzegovina football league system. The league champion is promoted to the Second League of the Federation of Bosnia and Herzegovina - West. It is divided in two groups.

Member clubs

Group A
List of clubs competing in 2020–21 season: 

 NK Bilalovac CPU
 NK Brnjaci
 FK Fojnica
 FK Kaćuni
 NK Katarina
 OFK Lugovi
 NK Romari Vitez
 NK Šantići

Group B
List of clubs competing in 2020–21 season: 

 FK Dnoluka
 NK Elektrobosna
 NK Gorica Guča Gora
 NK Karaula
 NK Metalleghe-BSI
 NK Mladost Nević Polje
 NK Nova Bila

References

4
Bos